Vanessa Crone (born October 29, 1990) is a Canadian former competitive ice dancer. She skated with Paul Poirier from 2001 to 2011, becoming the 2010 Grand Prix Final bronze medallist, 2011 Four Continents bronze medallist, 2008 World Junior silver medallist, and 2011 Canadian national champion.

Personal life 
Vanessa Crone was born on October 29, 1990, in Aurora, Ontario. She competed in track and field in addition to figure skating.

Career 
Early in her career, Crone also competed in single skating, and pair skating with Poirier. She and Poirier began skating together in May 2001. They won the silver medal at the 2008 World Junior Championships.

Crone and Poirier won silver at 2008 Skate Canada, their first senior Grand Prix event, and placed fourth in their second event. The next season they claimed the bronze at 2009 NHK Trophy. At the 2010 Canadian Championships, they were nominated to represent Canada at the 2010 Winter Olympics. They finished 7th at the 2010 World Championships.

Crone and Poirier began the 2010–2011 season by capturing gold at 2010 Skate Canada International ahead of Sinead Kerr and John Kerr who had a fall in the free dance. At 2010 Skate America, Poirier fell in the free dance but their score was enough for the silver behind Meryl Davis and Charlie White, both of whom fell, and ahead of Maia Shibutani and Alex Shibutani with no falls. Their results qualified them for the 2010–2011 Grand Prix Final where they won the bronze medal. They finished 10th at the 2011 World Championships.

On June 2, 2011, Crone and Poirier announced the end of their ten-year partnership. Crone confirmed she would like to continue competing and was looking for a new partner.

In 2012, Crone teamed up with Danish ice dancer Nikolaj Sorensen, with whom she planned to compete for Canada, but they soon parted ways. In November, Crone said that she was still searching for a partner to continue her competitive career. She teaches skating in the Toronto area, working with both figure skaters and hockey players.

Programs 

(with Poirier)

Competitive highlights 
GP: Grand Prix; JGP: Junior Grand Prix

Ice dancing with Poirier

Single skating

References

External links 

 
 Team Canada profile

Navigation

Canadian female ice dancers
1990 births
Living people
Sportspeople from Aurora, Ontario
Figure skaters at the 2010 Winter Olympics
Olympic figure skaters of Canada
Four Continents Figure Skating Championships medalists
World Junior Figure Skating Championships medalists
Skating people from Ontario